Hans-Jörg Fecht is Chaired Professor at the University of Ulm, Germany in the departments of Engineering and Computer Science. He is also an Office Director of the EUREKA Cluster Metallurgy Europe in the Same university, and a member of the European Academy of Sciences and Arts. He has published over 450 scientific publications, directed numerous national, European, and international research initiatives.

Education 
Fecht was born on 8 March 1957 in Germany. He Graduated in Materials Science at the University of Saarbrucken in 1981, followed by his Ph.D. in Materials Science at the same university supervised by Prof. H. Gleiter.

Research and career 
Fecht's research interests include non-crystalline and Nanocrystalline materials, non-conventional semiconductors, interface engineering, nanoengineering, electrical engineering materials characterization Optimization of functional materials and layer architectures & micro-structural, electrical, chemical, mechanical, and tri-bological properties. He researched on the Development of high-performance microelectronics, micro-systems, Nano-structure formation on the surface of railway tracks, and sensor materials that are also resistant to harsh environmental conditions,  sensors based on magneto-resistance (AG master), Photovoltaic Nanotechnology (AG Mr.) Nanoparticles with magnetic properties (AG Mr).

Fecht is presently a Chaired Professor of Engineering and Computer Science at the University of Ulm, Germany. Before obtaining his current role, he was a Post-Doctoral Research Associate in the University of Wisconsin–Madison, USA in the Department of Materials Science and Engineering and Senior Research Associate at the California Institute of Technology, Pasadena, USA in the Same Department.

Books 

 Nanoscience and Nanotechnology: Advances and Developments in Nano-sized Materials.
 Nano–Architectured and Nanostructured Materials: Fabrication, Control and Properties.
 The Nano–Micro Interface: Bridging the Micro and Nano Worlds.
 Carbon-based Nanomaterials and Hybrids: Synthesis, Properties, and Commercial.

Publications 
 Nanocrystalline metals prepared by high-energy ball milling.
 Structural and thermodynamic properties of heavily mechanically deformed Ru and AlRu.
 The mechanism of formation of nanostructure and dissolution of cementite in a pearlitic steel during high pressure torsion.
 Containerless processing in the study of metallic melts and their solidification.
 Entropy and enthalpy catastrophe as a stability limit for crystalline material.

References

External links 
 

1957 births
Living people
Academic staff of the Technical University of Berlin
Academic staff of the University of Ulm
German engineers
German metallurgists